Laclede Car Company was founded in 1883 by William Sutton and Emil Alexander, who later founded the American Car Company and worked at Brownell Car Company in St. Louis, Missouri, United States.

The company was a short-lived electric streetcar builder. It was located at 4500 North Second Street. It was bought out by St. Louis Car Company in 1903.

Defunct rolling stock manufacturers of the United States
Manufacturing companies based in St. Louis
Vehicle manufacturing companies established in 1883
Vehicle manufacturing companies disestablished in 1903
1883 establishments in Missouri
1903 disestablishments in Missouri
Electric vehicle manufacturers of the United States
Tram manufacturers

References